The XII Bolivarian Games (Spanish: Juegos Bolivarianos) were a multi-sport event held between April 24 - May 2, 1993, in Cochabamba and Santa Cruz de la Sierra, Bolivia. The Games were organized by the Bolivarian Sports Organization (ODEBO).

There were two opening ceremonies that took place on April 24, 1993, at the Estadio Félix Capriles in Cochabamba, and at the Estadio Ramón Tahuichi Aguilera in Santa Cruz, Bolivia.

In Cochabamba, the Games were officially opened by Bolivian president Jaime Paz Zamora.  Torch lighter was long distance runner Johnny Pérez, who won the silver medal in the 3000 metres steeplechase event at the 1981 Bolivarian Games.

Immediately after the end of the ceremony in Cochabamba, the president and a
number of officials from the organizing committee rushed by plane to Santa Cruz
to attend the other inauguration.

Gold medal winners from Ecuador were published by the Comité Olímpico Ecuatoriano.

Venues 
Cochabamba hosted the following sports: athletics (Estadio Félix Capriles),
cycling (Circuito Bolivariano), football (Estadio Félix Capriles), judo,
karate, racquetball (Country Club), table tennis (Coliseo José Castro),
taekwondo, and volleyball.

Santa Cruz hosted the following sports: basketball, boxing (Coliseo John Pictor
Blanco), equestrianism, fencing, gymnastics, shooting (Polígono de Santa Cruz), swimming, tennis, weightlifting (Coliseo Gilberto Menacho), and wrestling.

Participation 
About 1300 athletes from 6 countries were reported to participate:

 (170)

 Panama
 Peru (174)

Sports 
The following 19 sports were explicitly mentioned:

Aquatic sports 
 Swimming
 Athletics
 Basketball
 Boxing
Cycling 
 Road cycling
 Track cycling
 Equestrian
 Fencing
 Football†
 Gymnastics (artistic)
 Judo
 Karate
 Racquetball
 Shooting
 Table tennis
 Taekwondo
 Tennis†
 Volleyball
 Weightlifting
 Wrestling

†: The competition was reserved to youth representatives (U-17).

Medal count
The medal count for these Games is tabulated below.  A slightly different number of medals was published elsewhere.  This table is sorted by the number of gold medals earned by each country.  The number of silver medals is taken into consideration next, and then the number of bronze medals.

References 

Bolivarian Games
B
Bolivarian Games
B
Bolivar
Sport in Cochabamba
Sports competitions in Santa Cruz de la Sierra
History of Santa Cruz de la Sierra